Wiñay Wayna (2650 m) (Quechua for "forever young", Hispanicized spelling Huiñay Huayna) is an Inca ruin along the Inca Trail to Machu Picchu. It is built into a steep hillside overlooking the Urubamba River.  The site consists of upper and lower house complexes connected by a staircase and fountain structures. Above and below the houses the people built areas of agricultural terraces or andenes, which are still visible.

A camp site for hikers with the same name is located in the vicinity and is usually used as the last overnight camping site for hikers undertaking the classical Inca Trail.

Gallery

See also 

 List of archaeological sites in Peru

References

Archaeological sites in Peru
Inca
Archaeological sites in Cusco Region